Camouflage is the thirteenth studio album by Rod Stewart released in 1984 by Warner Bros. Records. The three singles from the album were "Infatuation", "Some Guys Have All the Luck", and a cover of the Free hit, "All Right Now". The album marked a reunion of sorts between Stewart and Jeff Beck, who plays guitar on several tracks, as the two had been members of the influential 1960s group The Jeff Beck Group.

Album information 
All the tracks were recorded at Lion Share Studio in Los Angeles, CA. Grammy award-winning producer Michael Omartian produced all the songs except "Bad for You", which was self-produced by Rod. In the liner notes, a disclaimer alludes to the reason behind this (specifically mentioning that Omartian was recently "born again").

Critical reception 

The album received similar reviews to its predecessor, Body Wishes, although Stephen Thomas Erlewine of AllMusic retrospectively called it "relatively better", due to a couple of strong singles in "Infatuation" and "Some Guys Have All The Luck". A review was not given in Rolling Stone magazine, but in the review for the album's successor, Every Beat of My Heart, they called the album "overly slick".

Track listing 
 "Infatuation" (Rod Stewart, Duane Hitchings, Rowland Robinson) – 5:13
 "All Right Now" (Andy Fraser, Paul Rodgers) – 4:41
 "Some Guys Have All the Luck" (Jeff Fortang ) – 4:33
 "Can We Still Be Friends" (Todd Rundgren) – 3:46
 "Bad For You" (Stewart, Kevin Savigar, Jim Cregan) – 5:17
 "Heart Is on the Line" (Stewart, Jay Davis) – 4:02
 "Camouflage" (Stewart, Savigar, Michael Omartian) – 5:19
 "Trouble" (Stewart, Omartian) – 4:42

Personnel 
 Rod Stewart – lead vocals
 Jeff Beck – guitar solo on "Infatuation", "Can We Still Be Friends" and "Bad for You"
 Jim Cregan, Michael Landau, Robin Le Mesurier – guitar
 Jay Davis – bass guitar
 Tony Brock – drums
 Kevin Savigar – keyboards
 Michael Omartian – keyboards, percussion, backing vocals, horn arrangements
 Jimmy Zavala – harmonica
 Gary Herbig – saxophone
 Jerry Hey, Chuck Findley, Kim Hutchcroft, Charlie Loper, Gary Grant – horns

Production 
 Producers – Michael Omartian (Tracks 1-4, 6, 7 & 8); Rod Stewart (Track 5).
 Engineered and Mixed by John Guess
 Second Engineer – Tom Fouce 
 Recorded at Lion Share Recording Studios (Los Angeles, CA).
 Mastered by Steve Hall at Future Disc (Hollywood, CA).
 Art Direction – Jeff Ayeroff, Paula Greif and Michael Hodgson.
 Design – Michael Hodgson
 Cover Photography – Steven Meisel
 Management – Arnold Stiefel

Charts

Weekly charts

Year-end charts

Certifications

References

External links 
 Rod Stewart fan club album detail

Rod Stewart albums
1984 albums
Albums produced by Michael Omartian
Warner Records albums